In Norse mythology, the Nine Mothers of Heimdallr are nine sisters who gave birth to the god Heimdallr. The Nine Mothers of Heimdallr are attested in the Prose Edda, written in the 13th century by Snorri Sturluson; in the poetry of skalds; and possibly also in a poem in the Poetic Edda, a book of poetry compiled in the 13th century from earlier traditional material. Scholars have debated what being "born of nine mothers" implies and have sought to connect the notion to other European folk motifs. Scholars have theorized that Heimdallr's Nine Mothers may be identical to the Nine Daughters of Ægir and Rán, who personify waves. In turn, Heimdallr would be born of the sea.

Attestations
The Nine Mothers of Heimdallr are mentioned in two books of the Prose Edda; Gylfaginning and Skáldskaparmál. In Gylfaginning, Heimdallr is introduced in chapter 25, where the enthroned figure of High tells the disguised mythical king Gangleri details about the god. Among other details, High says that Heimdallr is the son of nine sisters and, as a reference, provides two lines of the (otherwise now lost) poem Heimdalargaldr, in which Heimdallr says that he was born of nine sisters:
"Offspring of nine mothers am I, of nine sisters am I the son."
In chapter 16 of Skáldskaparmál a work by the 10th century skald Úlfr Uggason is quoted. The poem refers to Heimdallr as the "son of eight mothers plus one". Prose following the poem points out that the poem refers to Heimdallr as the son of nine mothers.

The poem Völuspá hin skamma (contained within the poem Hyndluljóð, often considered a part of the Poetic Edda) contains three stanza that scholars have frequently theorized as referring to Heimdallr and his nine mothers. According to the stanzas, long ago, a mighty god was born by nine jötunn maidens at the edge of the world. This boy grew strong, nourished by the strength of the earth, the ice-cold sea, and the blood of swine. Names are provided for these nine maidens. For discussion of these names, see Names section below (note that the translations below present anglicizations of Old Norse forms). The stanzas in question read as follows:

Names
Some of the names of Heimdallr's mothers found in Völuspá hin skamma  appear in a variety of other sources, where they may or may not refer to separate entities:
{| class="wikitable sortable plainrowheaders" style="font-size: 90%; width: 100%"
!scope=col|Name
!class="unsortable" scope=col|Meaning
!scope=col|Notes
|-
|Angeyja
|Meaning obscure. Proposed etymologies yield 'the harasser', 'bark', and 'those of the narrow island'.
|
|-
|Atla
|'The argumentative one' or 'the hefty'/'the forceful'
|Name appears listed among jötnar in the Nafnaþulur'
|-
|Eistla
|Meaning obscure. Suggestions include 'the stormy one' (from eisa, meaning 'hurry'), to a potential a sea god (from eista 'testicles', in other words, 'the swollen, swelling ones'), and 'the glowing one' (from eisa 'glowing ash, fire').
|
|-
|Eyrgjafa
|Possibly 'sand donor' or Ørgjafa 'scar donor'
|
|-
|Gjálp
|Possibly 'seeress' or 'roaring one'
|The name Gjálp appears frequently for jötnar in the Old Norse corpus. Gjálp and Greip appear together as names of the daughters of the jötunn Geirröðr in  Skáldskaparmál . Gjálp attempted to kill Thor by causing a river to swell.
|-
|Greip
|'Grasp'
|Gjálp and Greip appear together as names of the daughters of the jötunn Geirröðr in Skáldskaparmál.
|-
|Imðr or Imð
|Possibly related to íma 'wolf'.
|
|-
|Járnsaxa
|'The one with the iron knife'
|Name appears listed among the jötnar in the Nafnaþulur and the name refers to an apparently separate figure with whom the god Thor mothered Magni
|-
|Ulfrún
|'Wolf rune' or 'wolf-woman'
|Occurs as an Old Norse female personal name.
|}

Scholarly reception and interpretation
The names of all nine mothers mentioned above in Völuspá hin skamma appear elsewhere as the names of female jötnar (generally in the þulur). Adding to the confusion, Orchard points out, Gjálp and Greip are otherwise mentioned as jötunn maidens who seek to contravene the god Thor from reaching their father, and Járnsaxa is otherwise the mother of Thor's son, Magni.

Some scholars have linked the Nine Mothers of Heimdallr with the Nine Daughters of Ægir and Rán (who personify waves), an identification that would mean that Heimdallr was thus born from the waves of the sea. However, this connection has been questioned on the grounds that the names presented for the Nine Daughters of Ægir and Rán and the Nine Mothers of Heimdallr (as found in Völuspá hin skamma) do not match. Scholar John Lindow comments that the identification of Heimdallr's mothers as Ægir and Rán's daughters do, however, match on the grounds that Ægir and Rán's daughters, like Heimdallr's mothers, are sisters, and that two separate traditions about Heimdallr's mothers may explain the differences between the two.

Notes

References

 Bellows, Henry Adams (1923). The Poetic Edda. The American-Scandinavian Foundation.
 Dodds, Jeramy. Trans. 2014. The Poetic Edda. Coach House Books. 
 Faulkes, Anthony (Trans.) (1995). Edda. Everyman. 
 Lindow, John (2002). Norse Mythology: A Guide to the Gods, Heroes, Rituals, and Beliefs. Oxford University Press. 
 Orchard, Andy (1997). Dictionary of Norse Myth and Legend. Cassell. 
 Simek, Rudolf (2007) translated by Angela Hall. Dictionary of Northern Mythology. D.S. Brewer 
 Thorpe, Benjamin (Trans.) (1866) The Elder Edda of Saemund Sigfusson. Norrœna Society.
 Magnússon, Finnur (Danish) (1822) Den Ældre Edda: En samling af de nordiske folks ældste sagn og sange, Volume 1''. Gyldendahl.

Female supernatural figures in Norse mythology
Gýgjar
Nonets
Sisters